George E. Dolezal (November 8, 1919 – June 10, 1990) was a Republican, American judge, and politician.

Born in Chicago, Illinois, Dolezal lived in Berwyn, Illinois and went to the Berwyn public schools. He served in the United States Army during World War II. Dolezal graduated from DePaul University and John Marshall Law School. He practiced law in Berwyn. He served on the Berwyn City Council from 1953 to 1956 and was a. Dolezal served in the Illinois House of Representatives from 1957 to 1965. He then served as the first Republican mayor of Berwyn from 1965 to 1968. Dolezal was elected to the Illinois Circuit Court for Cook County, Illinois. After retiring from the circuit court, Dolezal moved to Duck Key, Florida. He served on the Monroe County, Florida Board of Commissioners and was president of the county board. Dolezal died at his home in Murphy, North Carolina.

Notes

1919 births
1990 deaths
Politicians from Chicago
Mayors of places in Illinois
People from Berwyn, Illinois
People from Monroe County, Florida
Military personnel from Illinois
DePaul University alumni
John Marshall Law School (Chicago) alumni
County commissioners in Florida
Illinois city council members
Illinois state court judges
Republican Party members of the Illinois House of Representatives
People from Murphy, North Carolina
20th-century American politicians
20th-century American judges
United States Army personnel of World War II